Diva is the debut solo studio album by Scottish singer Annie Lennox, released on 6 April 1992 by RCA Records. The album entered the UK Albums Chart at number one and has since sold over 1.2 million copies in the UK alone, being certified quadruple platinum. In the United States, it reached number 23 on the Billboard 200 and has been certified double platinum. Diva won the Brit Award for British Album of the Year at the 1993 Brit Awards. The album received nominations for Album of the Year, Best Female Pop Vocal Performance and Best Long Form Music Video, winning the latter award at the Grammy Awards the same year.

Background and reception
Following the informal dissolution of Eurythmics in 1990, Lennox took some time away from the music industry, during which she gave birth to her eldest daughter. She commenced working on her first solo album in 1991 with producer Stephen Lipson. Though she had been accustomed to co-writing material with Dave Stewart during her years with Eurythmics, eight of the ten tracks on Diva were written solely by Lennox herself, with two tracks being co-written by her. Upon its release, the album debuted at number one on the UK Albums Chart and would eventually yield five hit singles, three of which reached the Top 10 (although they had continued to achieve number one albums, Eurythmics had not scored a UK Top 10 single since 1986). Diva was ultimately certified quadruple platinum in the UK, more than any of Eurythmics' studio albums.

The song "Keep Young and Beautiful" was included on the CD release as a bonus track (the original vinyl album had only ten tracks). Another bonus track, "Step by Step", appeared on the Mexican and Japanese editions of the album and was also included as the B-side on the single "Precious". The song was later recorded by Whitney Houston for the 1996 film soundtrack The Preacher's Wife and subsequently became a hit single.

The headdress worn by Lennox on the album's cover (and seen in several of the album's videos) was obtained from the London-based costume company Angels. It had been used previously in the James Bond film Octopussy.

Critical reception

In 1993 the album was included in Q magazine's list of the "50 Best Albums of 1992". Rolling Stone described the album as "...state-of-the-art soul pop..." and it is included in Rolling Stones "Essential Recordings of the 90's" list.

In their review, Rolling Stone commented:
State-of-the-art soul pop, Annie Lennox's solo debut is sonically gorgeous; it also declares her aesthetic independence. Ace sessionmen polish Diva's gloss, and producer Stephen Lipson (Pet Shop Boys, Propaganda) operates in hyperdrive, but these eleven songs are fiercely those of a sister doing things for herself. Three years after her last outing with Dave Stewart, her cohort in Eurythmics, Lennox voids any notion that he was her Svengali and she merely the MTV beauty with stunning pipes. Writing nearly all of Diva, she manages a whirlwind tour of mainstream R&B and retains her singular persona – an ice queen thirsting to be melted by love.

Track listing

Video album

Lennox simultaneously released a video album for Diva, featuring promotional videos for seven of the album's tracks along with an excerpt of a track entitled "Remember", which has never been released elsewhere. The video album was directed by Sophie Muller, who had worked with Lennox during her later years with Eurythmics.

Later in 1992, the video album was reissued as Totally Diva, featuring two additional videos that had been made since the original release in April: "Precious" and "Walking on Broken Glass". Totally Diva was subsequently released on DVD in 2000.

The only omissions from the video album were "Little Bird" (the video for which had not yet been made at that time), and the album track "Stay by Me", for which no video was made.

Track listing

Personnel
Credits adapted from the liner notes of Diva.

Musicians
 Annie Lennox – all vocals, keyboards
 Stephen Lipson – guitars, programming, keyboards
 Peter-John Vettese – keyboards, programming, recorder
 Marius de Vries – programming, keyboards
 Luís Jardim – percussion
 Ed Shearmur – piano
 Keith LeBlanc – drums
 Doug Wimbish – bass
  – guitar
 Steve Jansen – drum programming
 Paul Moore – keyboards
 Dave DeFries – trumpet
 Gavyn Wright – violin

Technical
 Stephen Lipson – production
 Heff Moraes – engineering, MIDI management
 William O'Donovan – mixing assistance
 Ian Silvester – digital technician
 Ian Cooper – mastering

Artwork
 Laurence Stevens – sleeve designs
 Satoshi – photography (front cover)
 Anton Corbijn – photography

Charts

Weekly charts

Year-end charts

Certifications and sales

Accolades

Brit Awards 

|-
| width="35" align="center" rowspan="4"|1993||Diva || Best British Album || 
|-
| Annie Lennox (performer) || Best British Female Artist || 
|-
| Stephen Lipson (producer) || Best British Producer || 
|-
| "Walking on Broken Glass" || Best British Video ||

Grammy Awards 

|-
|  style="width:35px; text-align:center;" rowspan="3"|1993 ||rowspan="2"|  Diva || Album of the Year || 
|-
|Best Pop Vocal Performance - Female || 
|-
| Diva(Performer: Annie Lennox; Director: Sophie Muller; Producer: Rob Small)|| Best Long Form Music Video || 
|-

References

1992 debut albums
Albums produced by Stephen Lipson
Annie Lennox albums
Arista Records albums
Brit Award for British Album of the Year
Grammy Award for Best Long Form Music Video
RCA Records albums
Albums recorded at The Church Studios